The 2016 Burkina Faso coup d'état attempt was an attempt to overthrow the government of Burkina Faso on 8 October 2016. At least 30 ex-members of the elite presidential guard (known as the RSP) planned an attack on three locations: the presidential residence, an Army barracks, and a prison in Ouagadougou, the capital of Burkina Faso. Two people were killed and at least ten other people have been arrested in connection with the attempt. The attempted coup was led by Gaston Coulibaly, an ex-RSP member.

See also  
 2014 Burkinabé uprising
 2015 Burkinabé coup d'état
 History of Burkina Faso

References

Burkina Faso
2016 in Burkina Faso
Burkina Faso
Military coups in Burkina Faso
October 2016 events in Africa